Maria Monti (born 1935 in Milan) is an Italian film actress, singer and theatre artist.

Entering film in 1962 in Canzoni a tempo di twist she made nearly 30 film appearances between 1962 and 2002.

In 1971 she appeared in Sergio Leone's A Fistful of Dynamite.

Filmography

Vento di ponente (2002) TV Series .... Emma (2002-)
Controvento (2000) 
L'Ultimo capodanno (1998) .... The Contessa
La Medaglia (1997) .... Teacher
Gangsters (1992) .... Guest-house owner 
Milan noir (1987) .... Bianca
Strana la vita (1987) .... Anna's Mother
 (1985) .... Italian Mother
La Ragazza di Via Millelire (1980) 
Piccole labbra (1978) .... Anna
Mogliamante (1977) (uncredited) .... Hotel director
Ritratto di borghesia in nero (1977) .... Linda
Black Journal (1977) .... Second neighbor
Novecento (1976) .... Rosina Dalco
Al piacere di rivederla (1976) .... Bianca Bonfigli
Garofano rosso (1976) 
Le Avventure di Calandrino e Buffalmacco (1975) (mini) TV Series 
What Have You Done to Solange? (1972) .... Mrs. Erickson
La Notte dei diavoli (1972) .... The witch
Giù la testa (1971) aka A Fistful of Dynamite aka Duck, You Sucker!
La Prova generale (1968) 
Combat! .... French Peasant (1 episode, 1965)
Grandi camaleonti, I (1964) (TV) 
Eroi di ieri, oggi, domani, Gli (1964) 
L'Uomo che bruciò il suo cadavere (1964) 
La Bella di Lodi (1963) 
Canzoni a tempo di twist (1962)

External links
 Maria Monti official home page
Partial discography on Discogs
 

1935 births
Living people
Italian film actresses
Italian women singers
Actresses from Milan
Singers from Milan
20th-century Italian actresses
Italian television actresses